Maad a Sinig Mahecor Joof (English spelling in the Gambia; variations: Maad a Sinig Mahécor Diouf - French in Senegal; Maad Siin or Mad a Sinig Mahekor Juuf, also Maye Koor Juuf - in Serer-Sine language) was the last king to rule the Serer Kingdom of Sine, now part of independent Senegal. Maad a Sinig means king of Sine in the Serer language. He reigned from 1924 until his death in 1969 (3 August 1969, he died at Diakhao). After his death, the Kingdom of Sine was incorporated into independent Senegal.

Royal House
Maad a Sinig Mahecor Joof came from the Joof paternal dynasty of Sine and Saloum, from The Royal House of Semou Njekeh Joof (the third and last royal house founded by the Joof family of Sine-Saloum, founded in the 18th century by Maad Semou Njekeh Joof). He was a member of the Guelowar dynasty on his maternal line.

Legacy

By 1969, Maad Mahecor Joof although retired, was the only ruler in Senegal who possessed real power. The Serer kingdoms such as Sine and Saloum were the only pre-colonial kingdoms to survive up to 1969 (six years after Senegal gained independence from France). The Maad a Sinig (King of Sine) was very committed in the preservation of Serer culture and tradition.  During his reign, the Kingdom of Sine was economically prosperous. Indebtedness and migration was rarer in Sine than it was elsewhere. He performed the traditional role of the Maad a Sinig, presiding over the religious affairs of his subjects and became the focal point of the Sine-Sine (inhabitants of Sine).

In one of his last ever state addresses to his subjects regarding the oral history of Sine, he stated:

See also

Kingdom of Sine
Serer people
Kingdom of Saloum
Kingdom of Baol

Notes

Bibliography
  Diouf, Niokhobaye. "Chronique du royaume du Sine." Suivie de notes sur les traditions orales et les sources écrites concernant le royaume du Sine par Charles Becker et Victor Martin. (1972). Bulletin de l'Ifan, Tome 34, Série B, n° 4, (1972)
 Sarr, Alioune: " Histoire du Sine-Saloum (Sénégal). Introduction, bibliographie et notes par Charles Becker. Version légèrement remaniée par rapport à celle qui est parue en 1986-87"
 Villalón, Leonardo Alfonso. Islamic society and state power in Senegal: disciples and citizens in Fatick. Cambridge University Press, 1995. 
 Klein, Martin A. "Islam and Imperialism in Senegal Sine-Saloum, 1847-1914." Edinburgh University Press (1968)
Faye, Louis Diène. Mort et Naissance le monde Sereer. Les Nouvelles Editions Africaines, 1983. . p 59

Serer royalty
Joof family
Maad
Monarchs